720 most commonly refers to:

 720 (number)
 AD 720, a year in the Gregorian calendar
 720 BC, a year in the Gregorian calendar
 720 AUC, a year in the Julian calendar

720 may also refer to:

Arts, entertainment, and media
 720°, a 1986 skateboarding video game
 Minuscule 720, a Greek minuscule manuscript

Places
 Area code 720, an area code in Colorado, United States
 720 Park Avenue, a historic residential building in New York City, New York, United States

Science and technology
 720 AM, a radio frequency
 720 Bohlinia, a minor planet
 720p, a progressive HDTV signal format
 Code page 720, a code page used under DOS to write Arabic
 Lenovo IdeaPad 720, a discontinued brand of notebook computers

Transportation

Aircraft
 Boeing 720, an American narrow-body airliner

Automobiles
 Lifan 720, a Chinese mid-size sedan
 McLaren 720S, a British sports car

Rail transportation
 British Rail Class 720, a class of electric multiple unit trains
 New South Wales 620/720 class railcar, a class of diesel multiple unit trains
 South Australian Railways 720 class, a class of 2-8-4 steam locomotives

Roads and routes
 List of highways numbered 720

Other uses
 720 Naval Air Squadron, a former Naval Air Squadron of the Royal Navy's Fleet Air Arm